Glyphodella is a genus of moths of the family Crambidae from Africa.

Species
Glyphodella flavibrunnea (Hampson, 1899) (from Congo, Madagascar, South Africa)
Glyphodella savyalis (Legrand, 1966) (from Aldabra)
Glyphodella vadonalis (Viette, 1958) (from Madagascar)

References

Spilomelinae
Crambidae genera
Taxa named by Eugene G. Munroe